Varney is a given name. Notable people with the name include:

 Varney Anderson (1866–1941), American Major League Baseball pitcher
 Varney Monk (1892–1967), Australian pianist and composer
 Varney Parkes (1859–1935), Australian politician and architect
 Varney Sherman (born 1953), Liberian politician